Sporting Youth is a 1924 American silent comedy film directed by Harry A. Pollard and starring Reginald Denny. It was produced and distributed by the Universal Pictures.

Plot
As described in a film magazine review, Jimmy Wood, chauffeur, is sent with his automobile by his employer to California. He is mistaken for "Splinters" Wood, a famous British speed demon. He also meets and falls in love with Betty Rockford, the daughter of a wealthy automobile manufacturer. Jimmy enters an auto race with a $10,000 prize. The real Splinters, who is wanted by the police, also enters the race using an alias. Jimmy wins the race and, after his identity is revealed, the affections of Betty.

Cast

Preservation
Sporting Youth is an extant film and preserved at Filmmuseum Nederlands, now called EYE Institut, and at the UCLA Film and Television Archive.

References

External links

Lobby poster

1924 films
American silent feature films
Films directed by Harry A. Pollard
Universal Pictures films
American auto racing films
American black-and-white films
Silent American comedy films
1924 comedy films
1920s American films